Robert Bart (21 June 1930 – 15 January 2003) was a French sprinter. He competed in the men's 4 × 400 metres relay at the 1952 Summer Olympics.

References

External links
 

1930 births
2003 deaths
Athletes (track and field) at the 1952 Summer Olympics
French male sprinters
French male hurdlers
Olympic athletes of France
Place of birth missing
Mediterranean Games silver medalists for France
Mediterranean Games medalists in athletics
Athletes (track and field) at the 1955 Mediterranean Games
20th-century French people
21st-century French people